Pawan Pandit is the Office bearer of BJP, Haryana. He is a member of State Working Committee & In-charge of the website & information technology department of the Bharatiya Janata Party, Haryana. He is serving as the current editor-in-chief of Bhajpa Ki Baat since 2020. He is also a founder and national president of Bhartiya Gau Raksha Dal, a right-wing Hindu nationalist volunteer organisation.

Creative work 
Pawan Pandit is the author of the Alive Sentence, a life-affirming quotations book. He is produced musical compositions and music albums.

See also 

 Bhartiya Gau Raksha Dal
 Bharatiya Janata Party, Haryana
 Aam Aadmi Sangathan
 Bhajpa Ki Baat

References

Further reading

External links 
 
 
 
 
 

Bharatiya Janata Party politicians from Haryana
Living people
1983 births
Indian founders
21st-century Indian male writers
Indian writers